The Hunter House Victorian Museum in Norfolk, Virginia, United States is a house museum.

The house was built in 1894 for the merchant and banker James Wilson Hunter, together with his wife Lizzie Ayer Barnes Hunter and their three children. It was designed and built by the Boston architect W.P. Wentworth in the Richardsonian Romanesque style.

The museum opened in 1988. It includes Victorian furnishings and decorative arts belonging to Hunter's family.

References

External links
Hunter House Victorian Museum website

Houses completed in 1894
Museums established in 1988
Museums in Norfolk, Virginia
Historic house museums in Virginia
Romanesque Revival architecture in Virginia
Houses in Norfolk, Virginia
1988 establishments in Virginia